Miss America 2006, the 79th Miss America pageant, was held on the Las Vegas Strip in Paradise, Nevada on Saturday, January 21, 2006.

The pageant was broadcast live on CMT from the Theatre for the Performing Arts at the Aladdin Resort and Casino, the first time that the pageant was held outside Atlantic City. The pageant was held four months later than usual.

At the conclusion of the final night of competition, Downs crowned Jennifer Berry of Oklahoma as her successor. This was the first time since 2001 that the pageant winner was not a vocalist; Berry was also the first titleholder since to also win a preliminary talent award.

Selection of contestants
One delegate from each state was chosen in state pageants held in mid-2005. Prior to competing in state pageants, the majority of delegates first were required to win a local title. Each delegates title is pre-dated to 2005, for example Alexa Jones was Miss Alabama 2005 rather than Miss Alabama 2006. Many contestants competed in state pageants in both the Miss America and Miss USA systems numerous times before winning titles, and some had previously in states other than those where they won a state title.

All contestants were required to be between the ages of 17–24, unmarried and a citizen of the United States. They were also required to meet residency and education requirements.

Competition
All delegates compete in an interview competition with the judges, based on their platform issue, and also in the swimsuit, evening gown and talent competitions.

Prior to the nationally televised competition, the delegates participate in three nights of preliminary competition, where preliminary award winners are chosen in each category.

During the final telecast, following the announcement of the semi-finalists, the top ten compete in swimsuit and evening gown. The top five go on to compete in the talent competition, and the top three face a final interview round.

Results

Placements

Order of announcements

Top 10

Top 5

Top 3

Awards

Preliminary awards

Quality of Life awards

Other awards

Delegates

1 Abbrevs: NF = Non-finalist, RU = Runner-up, T = Top, Nat Sweetheart = National Sweetheart (competition for Miss America runners-up)

Judges
Leeza Gibbons
Jane Kaczmarek
Sharlene Wells Hawkes
Brian McKnight
Robert Verdi
Jerry Rice
Brenda Strong

External links
 Miss America official website

2006
2006 in the United States
2006 beauty pageants
2006 in Nevada
Zappos Theater
January 2006 events in the United States